MFK Vranov nad Topľou is a Slovak football team, based in the town of Vranov nad Topľou. The club was founded in 1901 and has spent three years in the Czechoslovakian second division and five years in the Slovakian second tier.

Colors and badge 
The colors of the team are white and green.

Recent seasons
The club's recent seasons:

Current squad 
As of 14 July 2022

Current technical staff
As of 5 September 2021

Managers
 Jozef Lehocký (? – September 2012)
 Jozef Kostelník (24 September 2012 – 31 December 2012)
 Miroslav Jantek (18 February 2013 – November 2013)
 Jozef Valkučák (20 January 2014 – April 2014)
 Miroslav Jantek (May 2014 – June 2014)
 Bartolomej Petro (July 2014 – February 2017)
 Emil Sudimák (February 2017 – 15 December 2017)
 Peter Košuda (27 December 2017 – June 2019)
 Ondrej Desiatnik (1 July 2019 – June 2020  )

Shirt sponsor and supplier

External links 

  

Football clubs in Slovakia
Association football clubs established in 1901
MFK Vranov